Angeline Marie Gervacio, also known as Dzi Gervacio, is a Filipino volleyball player. She is a former Ateneo Lady Eagles player and plays for the [Petro Gazz Angels]]. She is known as the Queen of Jump Serve

Career
Gervacio won the WNCAA Juniors Division Best Attacker award in 2006 and 2007. After completing her undergraduate studies at the Ateneo de Manila University and her UAAP career in March 2013, ending the Fab 5 era, Gervacio began her law studies at the same university.

On October 22, 2014, Gervacio joined Foton Tornadoes in the 2014 Grand Prix conference of the Philippine Super Liga (PSL) as a last-minute replacement for the injured attacker Joey Torrijos. She clarified that her participation with the Tornadoes would limited expected to miss some games as the tournament progresses because of her school schedule. During the 2015 PSL All-Filipino Conference, Gervacio suffered an injury in her left knee and taken to the Makati Medical Center while playing for Foton against Philips Gold. Later she was diagnosed through MRI that she had a displaced patella and suffered an anterior cruciate ligament injury. She returned to play the Shakey's V-League 13th Season Open Conference with BaliPure Purest Water Defenders.

In 2021, Gervacio decided to focus on beach volleyball joining the Creamline Cool Smashers. In January of the following year, she returned to indoor volleyball joining the F2 Logistics Cargo Movers if the Premier Volleyball League (PVL)

Clubs
  Foton Tornadoes (2014-2015)
  BaliPure Purest Water Defenders (2016)
  Perlas Spikers (2017–2019)
  Creamline Cool Smashers (2021; beach volleyball)
  F2 Logistics Cargo Movers (2022-2023)
  Petro Gazz Angels (2023-present)

Awards

Individual 
 2006 WNCAA Juniors Girls' Volleyball "Best Attacker"
 2007 WNCAA Juniors Girls' Volleyball "Best Attacker"
 2019 Premier Volleyball League Reinforced Conference "Best Opposite Spiker"

National Team 
 2019 Southeast Asian Games - Beach Volleyball -   Bronze medal, with Cherry Ann Rondina

Club 
 2016 Shakey's V-League 13th Season Open Conference -  Bronze medal, with BaliPure Purest Water Defenders
 2016 Shakey's V-League 13th Season Reinforced Open Conference -  Bronze medal, with BaliPure Purest Water Defenders
 2018 Premier Volleyball League Reinforced Conference -  Bronze medal, with Perlas Spikers
 2018 Premier Volleyball League Open Conference -  Bronze medal, with Perlas Spikers
 2019 Premier Volleyball League Open Conference -  Bronze medal, with Perlas Spikers

References

Filipino women's volleyball players
Living people
Ateneo de Manila University alumni
University Athletic Association of the Philippines volleyball players
Opposite hitters
1991 births
Competitors at the 2019 Southeast Asian Games
Southeast Asian Games bronze medalists for the Philippines
Southeast Asian Games medalists in volleyball
Filipino women's beach volleyball players
21st-century Filipino women